Clifford Ando (born 1969) is an American classicist who specializes in Roman law and religion. His work deals primarily with law, religion, and government in the Imperial era, particularly issues of Roman citizenship, legal pluralism, and legal procedure. In the history of law, his work addresses the relations among civil law, public law, and international law.

Ando is a professor in the Department of Classics, History and Law and in the College at the University of Chicago. He is a research fellow in the Department of Classics and World Languages at the University of South Africa, and the recipient of several fellowships, grants, and prizes. He has held fellowship and visiting professorships in Canada, France, Germany, New Zealand, and South Africa. He earned his bachelor's degree from Princeton University in 1990, and his doctorate from the University of Michigan in 1996. 

In 2008, he was among faculty members who questioned the establishment of the Milton Friedman Institute at the University of Chicago.

Major works
 Imperial Ideology and Provincial Loyalty in the Roman Empire (2000), winner of the 2003 Goodwin Award from the American Philological Association
 Editor, Roman Religion (2003)
 Co-editor with Jörg Rüpke, Religion and Law in Classical and Christian Rome (2006)
 The Matter of the Gods (2008)
 Law, Language and Empire in the Roman Tradition (2011)
 Le Droit et l'Empire. Invention juridique et réalités politiques à Rome (2012)
 Imperial Rome: The Critical Century (A.D. 193–284) (2012)
 Religion et gouvernement dans l'Empire romain (2012)
Ando has also published numerous articles, essays, and reviews.

References

External links
 Clifford Ando, "History and Science, History as Science: Simplification, Modeling and Humility" Chicago Journal of History, Spring 2017
 Bryn Mawr Classical Review, reviews of The Matter of the Gods and Imperial Ideology and Provincial Loyalty in the Roman Empire

American historians of religion
American classical scholars
Legal historians
1969 births
Living people
University of Michigan alumni
Princeton University alumni
Classical scholars of the University of Chicago
Historians of ancient Rome
21st-century American historians
21st-century American male writers
American male non-fiction writers